Luis María Holmanza Odelín (born 12 September 1949) is a Cuban former footballer who competed in the 1976 Summer Olympics.

International career
He represented his country in four FIFA World Cup qualifying matches and played two games at the 1976 Summer Olympics.

References

External links
 

1949 births
Living people
Cuban footballers
Association football defenders
FC Industriales players
Olympic footballers of Cuba
Footballers at the 1976 Summer Olympics
Pan American Games medalists in football
Pan American Games bronze medalists for Cuba
Footballers at the 1971 Pan American Games
Medalists at the 1971 Pan American Games
20th-century Cuban people